Hattieville is a village in the Belize District of the nation of Belize. Hattieville was established as a refugee camp after Hurricane Hattie made many people homeless in Belize City when it hit in 1961, but it became a permanent town.

Operation New Horizons 2007 built two additional school rooms onto the Hattieville government school between 17 March - 12 May 2007. This mission was under the command of the Louisiana Army National Guard.

Belize Central Prison (formerly Hattieville Prison) is in Hattieville. It is the only prison in Belize.

References

Populated places in Belize District
Belize Rural Central